Events from the year 1957 in Canada.

Incumbents

Crown 
 Monarch – Elizabeth II

Federal government 
 Governor General – Vincent Massey
 Prime Minister – Louis St. Laurent (until June 21) then John Diefenbaker
 Chief Justice – Patrick Kerwin (Ontario)
 Parliament – 22nd (until 12 April) then 23rd (from 14 October)

Provincial governments

Lieutenant governors 
Lieutenant Governor of Alberta – John J. Bowlen   
Lieutenant Governor of British Columbia – Frank Mackenzie Ross 
Lieutenant Governor of Manitoba – John Stewart McDiarmid 
Lieutenant Governor of New Brunswick – David Laurence MacLaren 
Lieutenant Governor of Newfoundland – Leonard Outerbridge (until December 16) then Campbell Leonard Macpherson 
Lieutenant Governor of Nova Scotia – Alistair Fraser 
Lieutenant Governor of Ontario – Louis Orville Breithaupt (until December 30) then John Keiller MacKay 
Lieutenant Governor of Prince Edward Island – Thomas William Lemuel Prowse 
Lieutenant Governor of Quebec – Gaspard Fauteux  
Lieutenant Governor of Saskatchewan – William John Patterson

Premiers 
Premier of Alberta – Ernest Manning   
Premier of British Columbia – W.A.C. Bennett 
Premier of Manitoba – Douglas Campbell 
Premier of New Brunswick – Hugh John Flemming  
Premier of Newfoundland – Joey Smallwood 
Premier of Nova Scotia – Robert Stanfield 
Premier of Ontario – Leslie Frost 
Premier of Prince Edward Island – Alex Matheson 
Premier of Quebec – Maurice Duplessis 
Premier of Saskatchewan – Tommy Douglas

Territorial governments

Commissioners 
 Commissioner of Yukon – Frederick Howard Collins 
 Commissioner of Northwest Territories – Robert Gordon Robertson

Events
January 1 – The first Canadian peacekeepers arrive in Egypt after the Suez Crisis
January 17 – , Canada's third and last aircraft carrier, is commissioned
March 6 – Quebec's Padlock Law is ruled unconstitutional
March 20 – The seven-month-long Murdochville Strike begins
March 28 – The Canada Council is established
April 15 - White Rock secedes from Surrey, British Columbia, following a referendum.
April 27 - The SS Moyie takes her final voyage.
June 10 – Federal election: John Diefenbaker's PCs win a minority, defeating Louis Saint Laurent's Liberals
June 21 – John Diefenbaker becomes prime minister, replacing Louis Saint Laurent
July 31 – The DEW Line begins operation
September 12 – Canada and the United States sign the NORAD agreement
October 4 – The first prototype Avro Arrow is presented to the media. The rollout is completely overshadowed by the flight of Sputnik I the same day.
October 12 – Foreign Minister Lester B. Pearson wins the Nobel Peace Prize for his work on the Suez Crisis
October 13 – Elizabeth II opens the Canadian parliament, the first monarch to do so
October 14 – Thanksgiving is moved to its current date, the second Monday in October
Equalization payments are established.

Sport 
April 16 – The Montreal Canadiens win their ninth Stanley Cup by defeating the Boston Bruins 4 games to 1. The deciding Game 5 was played at the Montreal Forum
May 6 – Saskatchewan Junior Hockey League's Flin Flon Bombers win their only Memorial Cup by defeating the Independent Ottawa-Hull Canadiens 4 games to 3. The deciding Game 7 was played at the Regina Exhibition Stadium 
June 14 – Édouard Carpentier (Édouard Ignacz Weiczorkiewicz) defeats Lou Thesz to become the 2nd Canadian NWA World Heavyweight Champion
November 30 – The Hamilton Tiger-Cats win their 2nd Grey Cup by defeating the Winnipeg Blue Bombers 32–7 in the 45th Grey Cup at Varsity Stadium in Toronto

Arts and literature

New works
F. R. Scott – The Eye of the Needle: Satire, Sorties, Sundries
Mordecai Richler – A Choice of Enemies
W.L. Morton – Manitoba: The Birth of a Province
Farley Mowat – The Dog Who Wouldn't Be
Northrop Frye – Anatomy of Criticism

Awards
 See 1957 Governor General's Awards for a complete list of winners and finalists for those awards.
Stephen Leacock Award: Robert Thomas Allen The Grass Is Never Greener

Television
Front Page Challenge premiers on CBC

Births

January to June
January 8 - Wendy Mesley, broadcast journalist
January 22 – Mike Bossy, ice hockey player (d. 2022)
January 28 – Michael Baker, politician (d. 2009)
February 17 – Loreena McKennitt, singer, composer, harpist and pianist
March 10 – Shannon Tweed, actress
March 24 - Olivia Chow, politician and widow of Jack Layton
April 20 – Bryan Illerbrun, football player (d. 2013)
April 29 – Leona Dombrowsky, politician
May 4 – Kathy Kreiner, alpine skier and Olympic gold medallist
May 14 – Gilles Bisson, politician
May 17 – Todd Hardy, leader of the Yukon New Democratic Party from 2002 to 2009 (d. 2010)
June 12 – Benedict Campbell, actor

July to September

July 2 – Bret Hart, wrestler and actor
July 6 – Ron Duguay, Canadian ice hockey player and coach
July 9 – George Nagy, swimmer
July 15 – Craig Martin, soccer player and coach
July 22 - Michèle Dionne, wife of Jean Charest, 29th Prime Minister of Quebec
July 26 – Mark Paré, National Hockey League linesman
August 6 – Francesca Gagnon, singer
August 11 – Tony Valeri, politician
August 15 – David L. Anderson, politician
August 15 - Richard Ayres, Business owner, Mechanic, Carpenter, Great Father 
August 16 – Mark Evans, rower and Olympic gold medallist
August 16 – J. Michael Evans, rower and Olympic gold medallist
August 20 – Cindy Nicholas, athlete and politician
August 23 – Georges Farrah, politician
August 26 – Rick Hansen, paraplegic athlete and activist for people with spinal cord injuries
September 10 – Darrell Dexter, politician and 27th Premier of Nova Scotia
September 23 – Sylvie Garant, model

October to December
October 9 – Art Boileau, long-distance runner
October 26 – Glen Murray, politician
October 30 – Joseph Cordiano, politician and Minister
November 12 – Andrée A. Michaud, writer
November 16 – Ferg Hawke, ultra-distance runner
November 21 – Sophie Lorain, actress, director and producer
November 22 – Glen Clark, politician and 31st Premier of British Columbia
November 30 – Colin Mochrie, comedian and actor
December 4 – Rob Shick, ice hockey referee
December 5 – Paul Steele, rower and Olympic gold medallist
December 6 – Louis Jani, judoka
December 12 – Robert Lepage, playwright, actor and film director
December 31 – Sonya Biddle, actress and politician (d. 2022)

Full date unknown
Daniel J. Caron, national librarian of Library and Archives Canada
Robert Poulin, murderer responsible for the St. Pius X High School shooting (d. 1975)
Nancy Richler, novelist

Deaths
January 16 – Alexander Cambridge, 1st Earl of Athlone, 16th Governor General of Canada (b. 1874)
August 21 – Nels Stewart, ice hockey player (b. 1902)
August 26 – Joseph Tyrrell, geologist, cartographer and mining consultant (b. 1858)
October 21 – Arthur Puttee, politician (b. 1868)
October 31 – Martha Black, politician and the second woman elected to the House of Commons of Canada (b. 1866)
December 10 – Roland Fairbairn McWilliams, politician and Lieutenant-Governor of Manitoba (b. 1874)
December 29 – Humphrey T. Walwyn, naval officer and Governor of Newfoundland (b. 1879)

See also
 List of Canadian films

References

 
Years of the 20th century in Canada
Canada
1957 in North America